Weiner is a surname of German origin.

Weiner may also refer to:

Weiner, Arkansas, a city
Weiner's, an American clothing retailer
Weiner (film), a documentary about Anthony Weiner, an American politician

See also
Wiener (disambiguation)